Busy Doing Nothing may refer to:

"Busy Doing Nothing", a song by Bing Crosby on the soundtrack of the film A Connecticut Yankee in King Arthur's Court 1949
"Busy Doing Nothing", a song by Japanese singer Crystal Kay, her US debut
"Busy Doin' Nothin'", a song by the Beach Boys
"Busy Doin' Nothin'" (Ace Wilder song), a song by Swedish singer Ace Wilder